Damilola Afolabi (born April 10, 1993), known professionally as L.A.X is a Nigerian recording artist. L.A.X started out as a rapper and was part of a three-man group called Flyboiz while he was still in high school. On August 20, 2013,  L.A.X signed a major-label deal with Starboy Entertainment moments after releasing the critically acclaimed song titled "Caro" which won him the "Diaspora Artiste of The Year" at the 2014 edition of the Nigeria Entertainment Awards.

Life and career

Damilola Afolabi was born in Lagos State, Nigeria. He had his secondary school education at Nigerian Turkish International College, Lagos where he formed a music group called Flyboiz, releasing a single titled "Busy Body". With the view of furthering his education, L.A.X left the group to study in the United Kingdom where he started recording songs and shot few videos.

In 2012, L.A.X released his first major single "Jaye" which featured vocal appearance from Ice Prince. Upon his return to Nigeria, he met Wizkid through his stylist and went on to sign his first professional recording contract with Starboy Entertainment in 2013.

On 20 August 2013, L.A.X teamed up with Wizkid to release his first single under the imprint titled "Caro" which gained massive airplay and further ushered him into the Nigerian music industry. "Caro" gained massive airplay and was critically accepted among music critics. The song was nominated in the "Hottest Single of The Year" category at the 2014 Nigeria Entertainment Awards.

Following the success of "Caro", L.A.X featured Wizkid on another song titled "Ginger". The song was nominated in the "Best Collaboration" category at the 2014 edition of BEN Television Awards. In August 2014, he completed his master's degree programme from the University of Manchester. In an interview with Ecomium Magazine, L.A.X revealed that he is working on his debut studio album.

Discography

Videography

Awards and nominations

References

External links

1993 births
Living people
Yoruba musicians
Nigerian male pop singers
Nigerian male singer-songwriters
Yoruba-language singers
English-language singers from Nigeria
21st-century Nigerian male  singers